USCGC Boutwell may refer to the following ships of the United States Coast Guard:

 , was an  operated by the United States Coast Guard
 , was a  cutter operated from 1968 to 2016.

See also 
 , was an iron-hulled revenue cutter of the United States Revenue Cutter Service operated from 1873 to 1907.

United States Coast Guard ship names